Krampus is a horned, anthropomorphic figure in the Central and Eastern Alpine folklore of Europe who, during the Advent season, scares children who have misbehaved. Assisting Saint Nicholas, or Santa Claus, the pair visit children on the night of 6 December, with Saint Nicholas rewarding the well-behaved children with gifts such as oranges, dried fruit, walnuts and chocolate, while the badly behaved ones only receive punishment from Krampus with birch rods. Krampus day itself, on the other hand, is on the 5th of December.

The origin of the figure is unclear; some folklorists and anthropologists have postulated it as having pre-Christian origins. Such events occur annually in most Alpine towns. Krampus is featured on holiday greeting cards called .

The figure has been imported into American popular culture, and has appeared in movies, TV and video games.

Etymology 

Origins 

The history of the Krampus figure has been theorized as stretching back to pre-Christian Alpine traditions, with celebrations involving Krampus dating back to the 6th or 7th century CE. Though there are no written sources before the end of the 16th century.

Discussing his observations in 1975 while in Irdning, a small town in Styria, anthropologist John J. Honigmann wrote that:

The Saint Nicholas festival we are describing incorporates cultural elements widely distributed in Europe, in some cases going back to pre-Christian times. Nicholas himself became popular in Germany around the eleventh century. The feast dedicated to this patron of children is only one winter occasion in which children are the objects of special attention, others being Martinmas, the Feast of the Holy Innocents, and New Year's Day. Masked devils acting boisterously and making nuisances of themselves are known in Germany since at least the sixteenth century while animal masked devils combining dreadful-comic antics appeared in Medieval church plays. A large literature, much of it by European folklorists, bears on these subjects. ...

Austrians in the community we studied are quite aware of "heathen" elements being blended with Christian elements in the Saint Nicholas customs and in other traditional winter ceremonies. They believe Krampus derives from a pagan supernatural who was assimilated to the Christian devil.

The Krampus figures persisted, and by the 17th century Krampus had been incorporated into Christian winter celebrations by pairing Krampus with St. Nicholas.

Modern history 
In the aftermath of the 1932 election in Austria, the Krampus tradition was prohibited by the Dollfuss regime under the clerical fascist Fatherland's Front and the Christian Social Party. In the 1950s, the government distributed pamphlets titled "Krampus Is an Evil Man". Towards the end of the century, a popular resurgence of Krampus celebrations occurred and continues today.

The Krampus tradition is being revived in Bavaria as well, along with a local artistic tradition of hand-carved wooden masks. In 2019 there were reports of drunken or disorderly conduct by masked Krampuses in some Austrian towns.

Appearance 

Although Krampus appears in many variations, most share some common physical characteristics. He is hairy, usually brown or black, and has the cloven hooves and horns of a goat. His long, pointed tongue lolls out, and he has fangs.

Krampus carries chains, thought to symbolize the binding of the Devil by the Christian Church. He thrashes the chains for dramatic effect. The chains are sometimes accompanied with bells of various sizes. The  may have had significance in pre-Christian pagan initiation rites. The birch branches are replaced with a whip in some representations. Sometimes Krampus appears with a sack or a basket strapped to his back; this is to cart off evil children for drowning, eating, or transport to Hell. Some of the older versions make mention of naughty children being put in the bag and taken away. This quality can be found in other companions of Saint Nicholas such as Zwarte Piet.

The Feast of St. Nicholas is celebrated in parts of Europe on 6 December. Sometimes accompanying St. Nicholas and sometimes on his own, Krampus visits homes and businesses. The Saint usually appears in the Eastern Rite vestments of a bishop, and he carries a golden ceremonial staff. Unlike North American versions of Santa Claus, in these celebrations Saint Nicholas concerns himself only with the good children, while Krampus is responsible for the bad.

Inspired by Paradise plays, which focused on Adam and Eve's encounter with a tempter, the Nicholas plays featured competition for the human souls and played on the question of morality. In these Nicholas plays, Saint Nicholas would reward children for scholarly efforts rather than for good behavior. This is a theme that grew in Alpine regions where the Roman Catholic Church had significant influence.

and  
There were already established pagan traditions in the Alpine regions that became intertwined with Catholicism. Due to sparse population and rugged environments within the Alpine region, the ban was not effective or easily enforced, rendering the ban useless. The  transformed into what is now known as the Krampus and was made to be subjected to Saint Nicholas' will.

It is customary to offer a Krampus schnapps, a strong distilled fruit brandy.

Europeans have been exchanging greeting cards featuring Krampus since the 19th century. Krampus is often featured looming menacingly over children. He is also shown as having one human foot and one cloven hoof. In some, Krampus has sexual overtones; he is pictured pursuing buxom women. Over time, the representation of Krampus in the cards has changed; older versions have a more frightening Krampus, while modern versions have a cuter, more Cupid-like creature. Krampus has also adorned postcards and candy containers.

Regional variation 
Krampus appears in the folklore of Austria, Bavaria, Croatia, the Czech Republic, Hungary, Northern Italy, Autonomous Province of Trento and South Tyrol, Slovakia, and Slovenia.

The twigs are painted gold and displayed year-round in the house—a reminder to any child who has temporarily forgotten Krampus. In smaller, more isolated villages, the figure has other beastly companions, such as the antlered "wild man" figures, and St Nicholas is nowhere to be seen.

A toned-down version of Krampus is part of the popular Christmas markets in Austrian urban centres like Salzburg. In these, more tourist-friendly interpretations, Krampus is more humorous than fearsome.

North American Krampus celebrations are a growing phenomenon.

In most parts of Slovenia, whose culture was greatly affected by Austrian culture, Krampus is called  and is one of the companions of Miklavž, the Slovenian form of St. Nicholas.

In many parts of Croatia, Krampus is described as a devil wearing a cloth sack around his waist and chains around his neck, ankles, and wrists. As a part of a tradition, when a child receives a gift from St. Nicholas he is given a golden branch to represent his good deeds throughout the year; however, if the child has misbehaved, Krampus will take the gifts for himself and leave only a silver branch to represent the child's bad acts.

In popular culture 

The character of Krampus has been imported and modified for various North American media, including print (e.g. Krampus: The Devil of Christmas, a collection of vintage postcards by Monte Beauchamp in 2004; Krampus: The Yule Lord, a 2012 novel by Gerald Brom); Krampus, a comic series from Image Comics in 2013 created by Dean Kotz and Brian Joines, television – both live action ("A Krampus Carol", a 2012 episode of The League) and animation ("A Very Venture Christmas", a 2004 episode of The Venture Bros., "Minstrel Krampus", a 2013 episode of American Dad!)–video games (CarnEvil, a 1998 arcade game, The Binding of Isaac: Rebirth, a 2014 video game), and film (Krampus, a 2015 Christmas comedy horror movie from Universal Pictures).

Criticism 
Every year there are arguments during Krampus runs. Occasionally spectators take revenge for whippings and attack Krampuses. In 2013, after several Krampus runs in East Tyrol, a total of eight injured people (mostly with broken bones) were admitted to the Lienz district hospital and over 60 other patients were treated on an outpatient basis.

Gallery

See also

Related figures 

 , another West Germanic figure associated with the midwinter period
 , a female figure in West Germanic folklore whose procession occurs during the midwinter period
 
 
 Goatman – a malevolent figure in urban folklore originating in Southern United States, like Maryland
 
 
 , a goat associated with the midwinter period among the North Germanic peoples
 
  – Creature in Finnish folklore
  – Creature in Balkan folklore
 
 , an ancient pre-Christian Slavic festival where participants wear masks and costumes and run around.
 
 
 , celebrated in the Low Countries on 5 or 6 December. He has a companion called Zwarte Piet (Black Pete), who used to punish bad children with a "roe", and kidnap them in bags to Spain.
 
 
 , a Swiss New Year's Eve celebration featuring a musical procession of performers in grotesque costumes.
 .

Other 
 
 Demon
 Horned deity

References

Bibliography

External links 

 Roncero, Miguel. "Trailing the Krampus", Vienna Review, 2 December 2013

Alpine folklore
Austrian folklore
German folklore
German legends
German legendary creatures
Christmas characters
Holiday characters
European demons
European folklore characters
Santa's helpers
Mythological monsters
Supernatural legends
Christmas in Germany
Bavarian folklore
Masks in Europe
Ritual masks
Devils
Companions of Saint Nicholas